Alison or Allison Smith may refer to:

Sportswomen
Allison Smith (swimmer) (born 1960), Australian Olympian in 1976
Alison Smith (sport shooter), New Zealand Paralympic sport shooter in 1984
Alison Smith (tennis) (born 1970), English player at 1994 Wimbledon

Writers
Alison Smith (critic) (c.1892–1943), American author of film and theater criticism
Alison Smith (journalist) (born 1954), Canadian television and radio journalist and anchor
Alison Mary Smith (born 1954), English professor of plant biochemistry at University of East Anglia
Alison Gail Smith, English professor of plant biochemistry at University of Cambridge since 2007
Alison Smith (curator), English chief curator at National Portrait Gallery, London, active since 1990s

Others
Allison T. Smith (1902–1970), Canadian member of Nova Scotia House of Assembly
Allison Smith (actress) (born 1969), American actress
Allison Smith (artist) (born 1972), American artist
Allison Smith, Calgarian voice artist who records Asterisk system prompts

Characters
Alison Smith, member of Women's Land Army portrayed by Sheila Sim in 1944 British film A Canterbury Tale

See also
 Alison Sealy-Smith (born 1959), Canadian actress, born and raised in Barbados
 Ali Smith (born 1962), Scottish writer
 Alison Smyth (disambiguation)